Small Town Sheriff is a 1927 silent animated short subject produced by Fables Studios and part of the Aesop's Fables film series started by Paul Terry.

Plot
An 80-year-old man travels on a rural road in his single-seat car. When his radiator overheats, he heads to a nearby water pump to cool it. While he cools, someone comes and rides away with his vehicle.

Not knowing what to do after his car was stolen, the man comes to a soft drink stand operated by a black civet. Despite the stand being labelled "soda", the beverages served there seem to give customers depressant-like effects such as drowsiness. The man orders a soda bottle, but is unable to open it. As an alternative, the civet offers soda in a glass. Upon drinking the beverage, he starts to twitch and lose consciousness.

The man dreams of himself in space, being thrown from one rock to another. On one rock he meets an invisible entity wearing a hat, gloves, and boots. The entity sells the man a bottle of soda, but as he is about to drink, the bottle vanishes. When he goes on looking for it, another pair of boots approaches and kicks him from behind, sending him airborne. He lands on a rising umbrella, but trouble from a pesky bird causes him to fall off. He then falls onto some terrain with soft bumps that repeatedly expand and contract. After the bumps send him floating again, he is met again by the civet on a boat who tosses him a ring attached to a rope. When he tries to reach the boat, a meteor comes and strikes the vessel. With no aid left, he tries in vain to swim himself to safety.

Finally waking up from his soda-manifested dream, the man finds himself being watched by the civet and various other stand patrons. He soon learns that the beverages are not good for consumption, and goes on to reveal himself as a sheriff by showing a brass star on his chest. The uncovered sheriff pulls out a gun and shoos away everybody at the scene.

Home media
The short is included in the Giant 600 Cartoon Collection.

References

External links
 
 Watch Small Town Sheriff

1927 films
1927 animated films
American silent short films
American animated short films
American black-and-white films
Aesop's Fables (film series)
Films about dreams
1920s American animated films
1920s English-language films